Sarbadev Prasad Ojha is a Nepalese politician, belonging to the Madhesi Janadhikar Forum. Ojha is the president of MJF in the Banke district. In April 2008, he won the Banke-3 seat in the Constituent Assembly election.

References

Living people
Madhesi Jana Adhikar Forum, Nepal politicians
Year of birth missing (living people)
Members of the 1st Nepalese Constituent Assembly